Zinkiv is a city in Poltava Oblast, Ukraine. It serves as the administrative center of Zinkiv Raion. Population:

Gallery

References 

Cities in Poltava Oblast
Zenkovsky Uyezd
Shtetls
Cities of district significance in Ukraine
Cossack Hetmanate